Alfreds Arnolds Adolfs Meders was a German-Latvian mathematician, and a student of Leopold Kronecker. He was a professor at the Riga Technical University until his mandatory repatriation to Germany in 1939.

References

20th-century German mathematicians
1873 births
1944 deaths
20th-century Latvian mathematicians
Scientists from Riga
Academic staff of Riga Technical University
Latvian emigrants to Germany